Cyrtopilus madecassus is a species of beetle in the family Carabidae, the only species in the genus Cyrtopilus.

References

Platyninae